was a railway station on the Towada Kankō Electric Railway Line located in the town of Rokunohe, Aomori Prefecture, Japan. It was 6.4 rail kilometers from the terminus of the Towada Kankō Electric Railway Line at Misawa Station.

History
Shichihyaku Station was opened on September 5, 1922. It had been unattended since March 1972.

The station was closed when the Towada Kankō Electric Railway Line was discontinued on April 1, 2012.

Lines
Towada Kankō Electric Railway
Towada Kankō Electric Railway Line

Station layout
Shichihyaku Station had a single island platform serving two tracks, connected to a small station building by an overpass. The station formerly had the rail yard for the Towada Kankō Electric Railway Line, until it was relocated to Towadashi Station in 1985.

Platforms

Adjacent stations

See also
 List of Railway Stations in Japan

References

External links
Totetsu home page 
location map

Railway stations in Japan opened in 1922
Railway stations in Aomori Prefecture
Railway stations closed in 2012
Defunct railway stations in Japan